Beck – The Money Man is a 1998 television crime thriller about the Swedish police detective Martin Beck directed by Harald Hamrell.

Cast 
 Peter Haber as Martin Beck
 Mikael Persbrandt as Gunvald Larsson
 Stina Rautelin as Lena Klingström
 Per Morberg as Joakim Wersén
 Ingvar Hirdwall as Martin Beck's neighbour
 Rebecka Hemse as Inger (Martin Beck's daughter)
 Fredrik Ultvedt as Jens Loftegård
 Michael Nyqvist as John Banck
 Lennart Hjulström as Gavling
 Lasse Lindroth as Peter (Inger's boyfriend)
 Bengt Nilsson as Leonard
 Peter Hüttner as Oljelund

References

External links 

Martin Beck films
1998 television films
1998 films
1998 crime thriller films
Films directed by Harald Hamrell
1990s police procedural films
Swedish LGBT-related films
Swedish crime thriller films
Films set in Stockholm
1990s Swedish films